Rabih Alameddine (born 1959) is a Lebanese-American painter and writer. His 2021 novel The Wrong End of the Telescope won the 2022 PEN/Faulkner Award for Fiction.

Early life
Alameddine was born in Amman, Jordan to Lebanese Druze parents (Alameddine himself is an atheist). He grew up in Kuwait and Lebanon, which he left at age 17 to live first in England and then in California. He earned a degree in engineering from the University of California at Los Angeles (UCLA) and a Master of Business in San Francisco. Alameddine is gay.

Career
Alameddine began his career as an engineer, then moved to writing and painting. His debut novel Koolaids, which touched on both the AIDS epidemic in San Francisco and the Lebanese Civil War, was published in 1998 by Picador. The author of six novels and a collection of short stories, Alameddine was the recipient of a Guggenheim Fellowship in 2002. He has lived in San Francisco and Beirut and currently teaches at the University of Virginia's creative writing program.

In 2014, Alameddine was a finalist for the National Book Critics Circle Award and he won the California Book Awards Gold Medal Fiction for An Unnecessary Woman. Alameddine is best known for this novel, which tells the story of Aaliya, a Lebanese woman and translator living in war-torn Lebanon. The novel "manifests traumatic signposts of the [Lebanese] civil war, which make it indelibly situational, and accordingly latches onto complex psychological issues."

In 2017, Alameddine won the Arab American Book Award and the Lambda Literary Award for Gay Fiction for The Angel of History.

He was shortlisted for the 2021 Sunday Times Short Story Award for his story, "The July War".

The Wrong End of the Telescope won the 2022 PEN/Faulkner Award for Fiction.

Works 
 Koolaids: The Art of War (1998)
 The Perv: Stories (1999)
 I, the Divine: A Novel in First Chapters (2001)
 The Hakawati (2008) 
 An Unnecessary Woman (2014)
 The Angel of History: A Novel (2016)
 The Wrong End of the Telescope (2021)

References

External links 

 
 Rabih Alameddine on Red Room

Lebanese emigrants to the United States
1959 births
Living people
Artists from Beirut
Lebanese atheists
UCLA Henry Samueli School of Engineering and Applied Science alumni
Postmodern writers
American Druze
Writers from San Francisco
Artists from San Francisco
Lebanese LGBT people
American gay artists
American gay writers
20th-century American novelists
21st-century American novelists
American male novelists
American short story writers
American LGBT novelists
American LGBT painters
Jordanian artists
Jordanian people of Lebanese descent
Lebanese contemporary artists
American male short story writers
Gay novelists
Gay painters
Prix Femina Étranger winners
Lambda Literary Award for Gay Fiction winners
20th-century American male writers
21st-century American male writers
20th-century American male artists
21st-century American male artists
People from Amman
Writers from Beirut